The Sopchoppy River is a minor river in the Florida Big Bend.

The river flows through the Apalachicola National Forest and the Bradwell Bay Wilderness, in addition to through the town of Sopchoppy, and a canoe trail  in length is designated along its length from the Oak Park Cemetery Bridge to US 319.

List of crossings

References

 Northwest Florida Water Management District: Major Water Bodies
 USGS: Sopchoppy River near Sopchoppy, Florida (Station 02327100)
 Sopchoppy River by Frank Howard
 DEP: Sopchoppy River Canoe Trail

Rivers of Florida
Rivers of Wakulla County, Florida
Apalachicola National Forest
Tributaries of the Ochlockonee River